Melanoplus keeleri, known generally as the Keeler's spur-throat grasshopper or Keeler grasshopper, is a species of spur-throated grasshopper in the family Acrididae. It is found in North America.

Subspecies
These two subspecies belong to the species Melanoplus keeleri:
 Melanoplus keeleri keeleri Thomas, 1874 i c g
 Melanoplus keeleri luridus (Dodge, 1876) i c g
Data sources: i = ITIS, c = Catalogue of Life, g = GBIF, b = Bugguide.net

References

Melanoplinae
Articles created by Qbugbot
Insects described in 1874